The 2011 Columbus Crew season was the club's eighteenth year of existence, as well as their sixteenth season in Major League Soccer, and their sixteenth consecutive season in the top-flight of American soccer.

Columbus began its 2011 campaign by hosting Real Salt Lake in the CONCACAF Champions League quarterfinal on February 22, 2011.

Background

Review 

The Crew opened its 2011 campaign with a Champions League quarterfinal fixture against fellow MLS competitor, Real Salt Lake. The match, the first leg of a quarterfinal series, was at Crew Stadium on February 22, 2011 and ended in a 0-0 draw. Columbus was trying to advance past the Quarterfinal stage after falling to Toluca 5-4 on aggregate last season.

On March 1, Columbus traveled to Rio Tinto Stadium and fell to Real Salt Lake by a score of 4-1, thus ending the Crew's run in the 2010–11 CONCACAF Champions League.

Two and a half weeks later, Columbus opened up its Major League Soccer campaign by traveling to Washington, D.C. to take on D.C. United on March 19. The club's MLS home opener was one week later, when the Crew hosted Red Bull New York on March 26.

Roster 
As of September 3, 2011.

Competitions

Preseason

Atlanta Pro Soccer Challenge

Columbus won the Atlanta Pro Soccer Challenge round-robin tournament title with a 2-0 record.

MLS

Standings

Eastern Conference

Overall table

Results summary

Results by round

Match results

CONCACAF Champions League

U.S. Open Cup 

With a fifth-place overall finish last season, the Crew secured direct qualification into the third-round proper of the U.S. Open Cup.

MLS Cup Playoffs

Statistics 
Last updated on 22 February 2011.

 

 

 

|}

Transfers

In

Out

Miscellaneous

Allocation ranking 
Columbus is in the #6 position in the MLS Allocation Ranking. The allocation ranking is the mechanism used to determine which MLS club has first priority to acquire a U.S. National Team player who signs with MLS after playing abroad, or a former MLS player who returns to the league after having gone to a club abroad for a transfer fee. A ranking can be traded, provided that part of the compensation received in return is another club's ranking.

International roster spots 
Columbus has 8 international roster spots. Each club in Major League Soccer is allocated 8 international roster spots, which can be traded. There have been no reported trades involving Columbus international roster spots for the 2011 season. There is no limit on the number of international slots on each club's roster. The remaining roster slots must belong to domestic players. For clubs based in the United States, a domestic player is either a U.S. citizen, a permanent resident (green card holder) or the holder of other special status (e.g., refugee or asylum status).

Future draft pick trades 
Future picks acquired: 2012 SuperDraft Round 2 pick acquired from D.C. United; 2015 SuperDraft Round 4 pick acquired from Houston Dynamo.
Future picks traded: None.

MLS rights to other players 
Columbus maintains the MLS rights to Aaron Hohlbein as the club selected him in the 2010 MLS Re-Entry Draft and he instead chose to sign with a non-MLS club.

See also 
 Columbus Crew
 2011 in American soccer
 2011 Major League Soccer season

References 

Columbus Crew seasons
Columbus Crew
Columbus Crew
Columbus Crew